King's College (Latin: Collegium Regis), often informally referred to simply as King's, is an independent secondary boarding and day school in New Zealand. It educates over 1000 pupils, aged 13 to 18 years. King's was originally a single sex boys school but has admitted girls in the Sixth and Seventh forms (Years 12 and 13) since 1980, and in the Fifth form (Year 11) since 2016. King's was founded in 1896 by Graham Bruce. King's was originally situated in Remuera, Auckland on the site now occupied by King's School, Remuera, in 1922 the school moved to its present site in the South Auckland suburb of Otahuhu.

The school has strong links to the Anglican church; the Anglican Bishop of Auckland,  and the Dean of Auckland are permanent members of the school's Board Of Governors. The College is a member of the Round Square group. King's celebrated its 125-year anniversary in 2021, while the 40 year anniversary of girls attending King's was celebrated in 2020.

Senior Leadership

King’s is governed by the King’s College Board of Governors, which is made of 13 members and chaired by Shan Wilson.

Enrolment
As a New Zealand private school, King's receives around $2000 per student from the government and charges parents of students tuition fees to cover costs.

At a February 2011 Education Review Office (ERO) review, King's College had 975 students including 31 international students. The school's gender composition was 85% male and 15% female, or 72% male and 28% female in the final two years. At the same review King's students identified as 79% New Zealand European (Pākehā), 7% Chinese, 4% Māori, 3% Indian, 2% Korean, and 5% other.

Sports
King's College competes in the 1A Rugby Competition and has won 16 times, most recently in 2019. The annual King's College v Auckland Grammar School rugby game is one of the oldest rivalries in New Zealand schoolboy rugby. The King's 1st XI Cricket team won the Gillette Cup in consecutive years between 2009 and 2011, producing notable cricketers with the most recent being Tim Southee.

Teaching and community activities
The school, like some others in New Zealand, offers students Cambridge A-Level, and IGCSE courses as well as those from New Zealand's national qualification, the National Certificate of Educational Achievement.

The school co-ordinates a service programme which aids the South Auckland community.

Houses
All students are organised into Houses, which form separate communities within the College.

*The colour for Parnell House is Gold, not Yellow as proclaimed previously. This is shown in a Parnell Newsletter from 2013 stating their house colour.

Traditions

School song
The school song of King's College is the Carmen Regale, the melody of which was composed by Dutchman Eduard Kremser and the lyrics were authored by I G G Strachan. The school song is shared, among some other things, with King's School in Remuera.

Notable former pupils 

King's alumni or former pupils are traditionally named Old Boys or Collegians.

Academic 
 George Cawkwell – ancient historian
 Richard F. Thomas — classicist

Arts 
 Jack Body – composer
 Marton Csokas – actor
 David de Lautour – actor 
 Laura Hill – actor
 Elizabeth Marvelly – singer
 Jamie McDell – singer
 James Wallace – businessman and arts patron
 KJ Apa – actor

Business 
 Jamie Beaton - founder of Crimson Education
 Sam Chisholm – former chief executive Nine Network and British Sky Broadcasting
 Rob Fenwick – Sustainable Advisory Panel
 Hugh Fletcher – chief executive of Fletcher Challenge
 Douglas Myers – brewer, philanthropist
 David Richwhite – merchant banker (of Fay, Richwhite)

Public service 
 John Manchester Allen (1901–1941), MP for the National Party
Douglas Rivers Bagnall, DSO DFC (1918–2001), RAF Wing Commander, notable WWII Wellington bomber pilot and commander
John Percy Bayly, Member of the Legislative Council of Fiji
 Peter Blanchard, KNZM, PC – Justice of the Supreme Court of New Zealand, Member of the British Privy Council
 Roy Calvert, DFC (1913–2002), WWII pilot
 Brian Carbury, DFC (1918–1962), leading flying ace of the Battle of Britain
 Paul East, CNZM, QC – former Cabinet Minister and High Commissioner to the United Kingdom
 Leon Götz, KCVO, (1892–1970), MP for the National Party
 John Henry, KNZM, QC – Justice of the Court of Appeal of New Zealand, Privy Councillor (see Privy Council of the United Kingdom)
 Colin Kay, CBE – former Mayor of Auckland and New Zealand triple jump champion
 John Lewis – former Headmaster, Eton College and Geelong Grammar School
 Jim McLay, KNZM, QSO – former Deputy Prime Minister, former leader of the National Party, former Permanent Representative to the United Nations (New York) for New Zealand, and current Representative of New Zealand to the Palestinian Authority
 Simon Moore, QC – Justice of the High Court
 Keith Park, GCB, KBE, MC & Bar, DFC, RAF – New Zealand soldier, World War I flying ace and World War II senior Royal Air Force commander, the key military figure in the Battle of Britain
 Geoffrey Sim, QSO, (1911–2002), Member of Parliament representing the National Party
 George Tupou V, (1948–2012), King of Tonga
 Sam Uffindell, Member of Parliament representing the National Party
 T. M. Wilkes, CBE, MC (1888–1958), Controller of Civil Aviation, New Zealand, developer and regulator of civil aviation policy

Science 
 Charles Fleming – scientist and environmentalist
 Allan Wilson – evolutionary biologist

Sport 
 Pita Alatini – All Blacks rugby player
 Teariki Ben-Nicholas – Rugby player for the Highlanders
 James Bevin – First-class cricketer
 Daniel Braid – 2002–03 All Blacks, 2002– Auckland NPC and Blues Super 14 rugby teams
 Mark Chapman — Black Caps cricketer
 Marcus Child – New Zealand hockey player
 Simon Child – New Zealand hockey player
 Mark Craig – Black Caps cricketer
 Peter Dignan – Olympic bronze medallist: rowing
 Alistair Dryden – Commonwealth Games silver medallist: rowing
 Ryan Fox – Professional Golfer
 Peter Hillary – Son of Sir Edmund Hillary, mountaineer and motivational speaker
 Bill Hunt – Olympic skier 
Josh Ioane – All Blacks and Highlanders rugby player 
 Mitchell Karpik – Maori All Blacks and Chiefs rugby player
 Ian Kirkpatrick – All Blacks rugby player and captain
James Lay – Samoa and Bristol Bears rugby player 
Jonah Lowe – Maori All Blacks and Hurricanes rugby player  
 Stefan Marinovic – Wellington Phoenix and New Zealand football goalkeeper
 Hamish Marshall – New Zealand Test/ODI cricketer
 James Marshall – New Zealand Test/ODI cricketer
 Peter Masfen – Olympic rower
 Anthony Mosse – Olympic bronze medallist, Commonwealth Games double gold medallist, silver medallist and bronze medallist
 Jared Panchia – New Zealand hockey player
 James Parsons – All Blacks and North Harbour NPC and Blues Super 14 Rugby teams (Captain)
Marcel Renata – Maori All Blacks and Blues rugby player 
 Jamie Smith – New Zealand hockey player and captain
 Kim Smith – Olympic long distance runner
 Tim Southee – Black Caps cricketer
 Rob Waddell – Olympic gold medallist: rowing; crew Member Emirates Team NZ
 Ali Williams – All Blacks and Auckland NPC and Blues Super 14 Rugby teams
 Dan Williamson – Olympic gold medallist in rowing

Headmasters

The following individuals have served as Headmaster of King’s College.

Coat of arms

Notes

References

Boarding schools in New Zealand
Anglican schools in New Zealand
Cambridge schools in New Zealand
Educational institutions established in 1896
Member schools of the Headmasters' and Headmistresses' Conference
Secondary schools in Auckland
1896 establishments in New Zealand